Brian Stephen Ihnacak (born April 10, 1985) is a Canadian-born Italian professional ice hockey forward. He is currently a free agent.

Career
Ihnacak was drafted by the Pittsburgh Penguins in the 2004 NHL Entry Draft, going 259th overall. With the National Hockey League reducing the number of rounds in the NHL Entry Draft from nine to seven in 2005, Ihnacak currently holds the distinction of being the last Pittsburgh Penguins draft selection to be drafted in the ninth round. The NHL Central Scouting service had Brian ranked 44th overall in North America before the 2004 NHL draft.

International career
Ihnacak competed at the 2014 IIHF World Championship as a member of the Italy men's national ice hockey team.

Personal
Brian's father, Peter Ihnacak, was a former Toronto Maple Leafs draft pick who was selected 34th overall in the 1982 NHL Entry Draft. His uncle, Miroslav Ihnacak, was also drafted and played for the Maple Leafs. Miroslav later played for the Detroit Red Wings.

Career statistics

Regular season and playoffs

International

Awards and honors

References

External links
 

1985 births
Living people
Ice hockey people from Toronto
Italian ice hockey centres
Canadian ice hockey centres
Italian people of Czech descent
Italian people of Slovak descent
Canadian people of Czech descent
Canadian people of Slovak descent
Allen Americans players
Augusta Lynx players
HK Poprad players
HKM Zvolen players
MHK Kežmarok players
HC Sparta Praha players
HC Litvínov players
HC Dynamo Pardubice players
Fort Worth Brahmas players
Mississippi RiverKings (CHL) players
Pittsburgh Penguins draft picks
Vålerenga Ishockey players
Brown Bears men's ice hockey players
HC '05 Banská Bystrica players
HC Košice players
Canadian expatriate ice hockey players in Norway
Italian expatriate sportspeople in Norway
Canadian sportspeople of Italian descent
Canadian expatriate ice hockey players in the United States
Italian expatriate sportspeople in Slovakia
Canadian expatriate ice hockey players in Slovakia
Canadian expatriate ice hockey players in Sweden
Canadian expatriate ice hockey players in the Czech Republic
Canadian expatriate ice hockey players in Switzerland
Italian expatriate sportspeople in Switzerland
Italian expatriate sportspeople in the Czech Republic
Naturalised citizens of Italy
Italian expatriate ice hockey people
Naturalised sports competitors